Dorëz is a village in the Elbasan County, eastern Albania. Following the local government reform of 2015, Dorëz became a part of the municipality of Librazhd and is under the municipal unit of Qendër Librazhd

Demographic History
Dorëz (Dorazi) is attested in the Ottoman defter of 1467 as a settlement in the vilayet of Çermeniça. The village had a total of 10 households represented by the following household heads: Nikolla Primiqyri, Pop Nikolla, Andrije Pishkashi, Llazar Derezi, Nikolla Bosida, Gjergj Draksha, Gjin Derezi, Dimitri Pelisha, Dimitri Lala, and Petko Pelisha.

References

Villages in Elbasan County
Populated places in Librazhd